Saryshka (Sırışqı) is a rural locality (a village) in Zigazinsky Selsoviet, Beloretsky District, Bashkortostan, Russia. The population was 1 as of 2010.

Geography 
Saryshka is located 107 km west of Beloretsk (the district's administrative centre) by road. Butayevo is the nearest rural locality.

References 

Rural localities in Beloretsky District